Nathan Webb (May 7, 1825 – November 8, 1902) was a United States district judge of the United States District Court for the District of Maine.

Education and career

Born in Portland, Maine, Webb received an Artium Baccalaureus degree from Harvard University in 1846 and read law to enter the bar in 1849. He was in private practice in Portland from 1849 to 1865, becoming county attorney of Cumberland County, Maine in 1866. He was the United States Attorney for the District of Maine from 1870 to 1878, thereafter resuming his private practice in Portland until 1882.

Federal judicial service

On January 18, 1882, Webb was nominated by President Chester A. Arthur to a seat on the United States District Court for the District of Maine vacated by Judge Edward Fox. Webb was confirmed by the United States Senate on January 24, 1882, and received his commission the same day. Webb served in that capacity until his retirement from the bench on June 30, 1902. He died in Portland on November 8, 1902.

References

Sources
 

1825 births
1902 deaths
Harvard University alumni
United States Attorneys for the District of Maine
Judges of the United States District Court for the District of Maine
United States federal judges appointed by Chester A. Arthur
19th-century American judges
Lawyers from Portland, Maine
District attorneys in Cumberland County, Maine
United States federal judges admitted to the practice of law by reading law